Pogonocherus plasoni is a species of beetle in the family Cerambycidae. It was described by Ganglbauer in 1884. It is known from Greece and Croatia.

References

Pogonocherini
Beetles described in 1884